"Un Rock Star" is the 9th extended play from the Japanese band Orange Range. This single was used as the cover song for a string of Honda Stream commercials in Japan. It was also used as the theme to a Japanese sports show. This single first entered the Oricon charts at the number 3 spot, breaking the consecutive string of nine number 1 singles. This single was a 100,000 limited-release item.

Track list
"Un Rock Star"
"Fūrinkazan" (風林火山; Sengoku-period Battle Flag)
"My Rifle feat. Petunia Rocks" (マイ・ライフル: feat.ペチュニアロックス)
"U topia: Live Tour 005 Natural"

Charts

Oricon chart (Japan)

Orange Range songs
2006 singles
2006 songs
Song articles with missing songwriters